Yapağılı can refer to:

 Yapağılı, Dinar
 Yapağılı, Köprüköy